Ardgowan may refer to:
 Ardgowan House, near Inverkip, Scotland
 Ardgowan, New Zealand in North Otago
 Ardgowan, Prince Edward Island, Canada, National Historic Site